2015 North American winter may refer to:
2014–15 North American winter
2015–16 North American winter